"Love (Makes Me Do Foolish Things)" is a 1965 pop ballad by Motown girl group Martha and the Vandellas. A rare ballad for the group, whose forte was reportedly uptempo soul dance numbers including "Dancing in the Street" and "Nowhere to Run", the b-side to the group's single, "You've Been in Love Too Long", although the song only peaked at #70 on the Billboard Hot 100 singles chart and #22 on the Billboard Hot R&B singles chart, it was number one on many American urban radio playlists.The song, written and produced by Holland–Dozier–Holland, has the narrator explain why love makes her do things she later regrets.  Cash Box described it as a "plaintive, slow-shufflin’ heart-throbber with a nostalgic years-back sound."

Other artist recording the song include: Kim Weston (original recording artist on unreleased track), Diana Ross and the Supremes, Thee Midnighters, Slim Smith, Jean Carn, Billy Preston, and Eula Cooper. The Andantes recorded co-backing vocals on all three Motown recordings.

Personnel
Lead vocals by Martha Reeves
Background vocals by The Andantes: Jackie Hicks, Marlene Barrow and Louvain Demps
Produced by Brian Holland and Lamont Dozier
Written by Brian Holland, Lamont Dozier and Edward Holland, Jr.
Instrumentation by The Funk Brothers

References

1965 singles
Pop ballads
Martha and the Vandellas songs
Songs written by Holland–Dozier–Holland
Gordy Records singles
Song recordings produced by Brian Holland
Song recordings produced by Lamont Dozier
The Supremes songs
1965 songs